Osmond or Osmonds may refer to:


People
 Osmond (surname)
 Osmund, a list of people with the given name Osmond or Osmund

Arts and entertainment
 Gilbert Osmond, in the novel The Portrait of a Lady, by Henry James
 Osmond Bates, in Sahara, a war movie, and the 1995 remake
 The Osmonds, an American family music group
 Osmonds (album), their third album
 The Osmonds (TV series), a 1972 cartoon series starring the Osmonds
 The Osmonds (musical), a 2022 stage musical based on the family
 Osmond Studios, a television production studio in Utah used by the Osmonds

Places
 Osmond, Nebraska, United States, a city
 Osmond, Wyoming, United States, a census-designated place
 Osmond, Newfoundland and Labrador, Canada

See also 
 Osmond process, a way to make wrought iron starting around the 13th century
 Åsmund (disambiguation)
 Osmund (disambiguation)